Vincent Cave was Archdeacon of Elphin from 1669 until 1670.

References 

Archdeacons of Elphin
17th-century Irish Anglican priests